北, meaning "north", may refer to:
Kita (surname), a Japanese surname
A given name (pronounced Běi in Mandarin and Buk in Korean)
Choe Buk, Joseon Dynasty painter
Law Pak (born 1929), Hong Kong football coach

See also

Bei River, tributary of the Pearl River in southern China
Buk-gu (disambiguation), various districts in South Korea
Kita-ku (disambiguation), various districts in Japan